Nikos Theodosiadis (born 14 January 1973) is a Greek professional football manager and former player.

References

1973 births
Living people
Pierikos F.C. players
Greek football managers
Pierikos F.C. managers
Iraklis Thessaloniki F.C. managers
PAE Kerkyra managers
Footballers from Katerini
Greek footballers
Association footballers not categorized by position